The Srikrishna Museum is located next to Kurukshetra Panorama and Science Centre in Kurukshetra, Haryana, India.

Exhibits
It has a big range of exhibits including  ancient sculptures, carvings and paintings, dioramas, giant statues, surreal sounds and a walk-through maze.

See also

 Haryana State Museum at Panchkula
 Haryana Rural Antique Museum at HAU Hisar
 Jahaj Kothi Museum at Hisar fort
 Rakhigarhi Indus Valley Civilisation Museum near Hisar
 Sheikhpura Kothi near Hansi
 Dharohar Museum at Kurukshetra University
 Kurukshetra Panorama and Science Centre at Kurukshetra
 Sheikh Chilli's Tomb at Kurukshetra 
 Rewari Railway Heritage Museum at Rewari railway station

References

External links
  Shrikrishna Museum website
 Shrikrishna Museum Video

Kurukshetra
Museums in Kurukshetra